Béatrice Filliol (born 12 May 1969) is a former French alpine skier who competed in the 1992 Winter Olympics and 1994 Winter Olympics.

External links
 sports-reference.com
 

1969 births
Living people
French female alpine skiers
Olympic alpine skiers of France
Alpine skiers at the 1992 Winter Olympics
Alpine skiers at the 1994 Winter Olympics
Place of birth missing (living people)
20th-century French women